The 1939 All-Pro Team consisted of American football players chosen by various selectors for the All-Pro team of the National Football League (NFL) for the 1939 NFL season. Teams were selected by, among others, the NFL coaches (NFL), Professional Football Writers Association (PFW), the United Press (UP), the International News Service (INS), Collyer's Eye (CE), and the New York Daily News (NYDN).

Players displayed in bold were consensus first-team selections. Four players were selected for the first team by all six selectors: Chicago Bears fullback Bill Osmanski; Green Bay Packers end Don Hutson; Chicago Bears tackle Joe Stydahar; and Chicago Bears guard Dan Fortmann.

Team

References

All-Pro Teams
1939 National Football League season